The 2022–23 Kenya Women's Quadrangular Series was a Women's Twenty20 International (WT20I) cricket tournament that took place in Nairobi in December 2022. Originally announced as a tri-nation series involving Kenya, Uganda and Qatar, the tournament became a quadrangular event with the addition of Tanzania. The African sides were in action for the first time since the 2022 Kwibuka T20 Tournament that was played in June 2022.

Uganda secured top spot in the round-robin with a game to spare. Kenya defeated Tanzania by 2 wickets in the last game of the round-robin stage to set up a final against Uganda. Uganda went on to defeat the hosts in the final by 6 wickets to win the tournament. Tanzania defeated winless Qatar in the third-place play-off. Uganda's Janet Mbabazi was named player of the tournament.

Squads

Round-robin

Points table

 Qualified for the final
 Advanced to the third place play-off

Fixtures

Third-place play-off

Final

References

External links
 Series home at ESPNcricinfo

Associate international cricket competitions in 2022–23
Kenya Women's Quadrangular Series
Women's cricket in Kenya